Allez France (24 May 1970 – 11 December 1989) was an American-bred, French-trained Thoroughbred racehorse and broodmare. Winner of the French 1000 Guineas, the French Oaks and the Prix de l'Arc de Triomphe, she was one of the greatest-ever fillies in European flat racing.

Background
Allez France was a bay mare bred in Kentucky by Bieber-Jacobs Stable. She became his first important horse owned by the French art dealer Daniel Wildenstein and the spur for his substantial investment in racehorses and bloodstock. For his horses in France, Wildenstein operated Dayton Investments Limited. For those in the United States, he owned the Allez France Stables.

Racing career
During her racing career from age two to five, Allez France was the pre-eminent filly in France, rivaled only by Dahlia (in six meetings however, Allez France was never beaten by Dahlia). In 1974, under new trainer Angel Penna, Sr., she went undefeated and won the Prix de l'Arc de Triomphe, France's most prestigious horse race. She was crowned French Horse of the Year. See https://www.youtube.com/watch?v=Xl0Q-Kqa1Qk.

As a six-year-old, Allez France was sent to race in the United States but, as was the case in other races outside France, she did not do well. In 1976, she was retired as a broodmare to Lane's End Farm in Versailles, Kentucky.

Achievement and assessment
Her Timeform rating of 136 places Allez France joint first all time for European fillies.

Breeding record
Allez France was the dam of the successful sire Air De France (1984–2004), who sired 11 stakes winners with a total of 34 stakes wins.

1980 Ave France (USA) : Bay filly by Seattle Slew (USA) - unraced
1984 Air de France (USA) : Brown colt, foaled 7 March, by Seattle Slew (USA) - won 1 race from two starts in France, successful sire in Australia 
1985 Action Francaise (USA) : Brown filly by Nureyev (USA) - won two races including the G3 Prix de Sandringham at Chantilly from 4 starts in France and England 1988

After her death, Allez France was honored by being buried next to Man O' War and other greats at the Kentucky Horse Park near Lexington, Kentucky.

Pedigree

See also
 List of historical horses

References

External links
 Allez France's pedigree and partial racing stats

1970 racehorse births
1989 racehorse deaths
Racehorses bred in Kentucky
Racehorses trained in France
Arc winners
Thoroughbred family 1-x